Stanisław Zahradnik (born 26 April 1932 in Kojkovice) is a Czech historian of Polish ethnicity. He specializes in the history of Cieszyn Silesia and the region of Zaolzie.

Zahradnik graduated from the Juliusz Słowacki Polish Gymnasium in Český Těšín in 1951. Two years later he graduated from the Faculty of History at the Charles University in Prague. In 1968 he earned his doctorate at the same university. Afterwards he moved back to his native Třinec where he was employed as the head of the archive of the Třinec Iron and Steel Works until 1992, when he retired.

Books 
 Třinecké železárny: období báňské a hutní společnosti: 1906-1938 (1969)
 Zaolziańskie ofiary okupacji hitlerowskiej (1988)
 Czasopiśmiennictwo w języku polskim na terenach Czechosłowacji w latach 1848-1938 (1989)
 Struktura narodowościowa Zaolzia na podstawie spisów ludności: 1880-1991 (1991)
 Korzenie Zaolzia (1992, with Marek Ryczkowski)
 Polacy na Zaolziu w historii, statystyce i dokumentach (1995)

References

External links
 V Třinci ocenili badatele i astronoma 

1932 births
Polish people from Zaolzie
20th-century Czech historians
20th-century Polish historians
Charles University alumni
Living people
Writers from Třinec